Maretić is a Croatian surname.

Notable people with the name include:

 Damir Maretić (born 1969), Croatian football player
 Juraj Maretić (born 1993), Croatian football player
 Tomislav Maretić (1854–1938), Croatian linguist and lexicographer

See also
 Martić

Croatian surnames